The 2000–01 AHL season was the 65th season of the American Hockey League. The league realigned its divisions again. The Atlantic division was renamed as the Canadian division. The Empire State division was replaced by the South division, with many teams shifting from the Mid-Atlantic division.

Twenty teams played 80 games each in the schedule. The Worcester IceCats finished first overall in the regular season. The Saint John Flames won their first Calder Cup championship.

Team changes
 The Norfolk Admirals joined the AHL as an expansion team, based in Norfolk, Virginia, playing in the South division.
 The Lowell Lock Monsters switched divisions from Atlantic to New England.
 The Hamilton Bulldogs switched divisions from Empire State to Canadian.
 The Albany River Rats, Rochester Americans, Syracuse Crunch and Wilkes-Barre/Scranton Penguins switched from the Empire State division to the Mid-Atlantic division.
 The Cincinnati Mighty Ducks, Kentucky Thoroughblades and Louisville Panthers switched from the Mid-Atlantic division to the South division.

Final standings
Note: GP = Games played; W = Wins; L = Losses; T = Ties; OTL = Overtime losses; GF = Goals for; GA = Goals against; Pts = Points;

Eastern Conference

Western Conference

Scoring leadersNote: GP = Games played; G = Goals; A = Assists; Pts = Points; PIM = Penalty minutes''

 complete list

Calder Cup playoffs

All Star Classic
The 14th AHL All-Star Game was played on January 15, 2001 at the First Union Arena at Casey Plaza in Wilkes-Barre, Pennsylvania. Team Canada defeated Team PlanetUSA 11-10. In the skills competition held the day before the All-Star Game, Team PlanetUSA won 16-8 over Team Canada.

Trophy and award winners

Team awards

Individual awards

Other awards

See also
List of AHL seasons

References
AHL official site
AHL Hall of Fame
HockeyDB

 
American Hockey League seasons
2
AHL